Göritz is a municipality in Brandenburg, Germany.

Göritz or Goritz may also refer to:

Places
 Göritz (river), Thuringia, Germany
 Göritz, Thuringia, a district of the town Hirschberg, Thuringia, Germany
 Górzyca, Lubusz Voivodeship (German name Göritz), a village in western Poland
 Gorzyca, West Pomeranian Voivodeship (German name Göritz), a village in north-western Poland

People
 Hansjörg Göritz (born 1959), German-American architect, professor, author and designer
 Otto Goritz (1873–1929), German baritone